Tanikaze can refer to:

Tanikaze Kajinosuke, a sumo wrestler
Japanese destroyer Tanikaze, two destroyers of the Imperial Japanese Navy